The Central Minneapolis community is located in the central part of the city, consisting of 6 smaller official neighborhoods, and includes Downtown Minneapolis and the central business district. It also includes the many old flour mills, the Mill District, and other historical and industrial areas of Downtown Minneapolis. It also includes some high-density residential areas surrounding it, excluding areas east of the Mississippi River. Businesses based in the Central area include the corporate headquarters of Target, US Bank, and the broadcast facilities of Minnesota CBS station WCCO-TV.

Official neighborhoods in the Central community
Downtown East
Downtown West where most of the high-rise office buildings are located
Elliot Park
Loring Park
North Loop commonly referred to as the Warehouse District
Stevens Square/Loring Heights

Gallery

See also

Neighborhoods of Minneapolis

References

Communities in Minneapolis
Central business districts in the United States